Ambarawa is a town (and administratively, a district of the Semarang Regency) located between the city of Semarang and Salatiga in Central Java, Indonesia. Administratively, it is bordered by the districts of Banyubiru to the south, Jambu to the west, Bandungan to the north, and Bawen to the east.

During colonial times, Ambarawa was an important railway hub connecting through regions in Java as far as Yogyakarta and Magelang.  The Semarang-Ambarawa-Magelang line was fully operational until 1977. It is the site of the Indonesian Railway Museum (Museum Kereta Api Ambarawa), which features a section of rack railway between Ambarawa to Bedono on the former Ambarawa-Magelang mainline. The 19th-century Fort Willem I penitentiary complex and military barrack is also located in Ambarawa.

Japanese internment camps 
Ambarawa was the site of Japanese internment camps where up to 15,000 Europeans had been held during the Japanese occupation during World War II.  Following Japanese surrender and the subsequent proclamation of Indonesian independence, fighting broke out in and around Ambarawa on 20 November 1945 between British troops evacuating European internees and Indonesian Republicans.

Battle of Ambarawa 
The town of Ambarawa was the site of the Battle of Ambarawa which itself was a part of the greater Indonesian War of Independence. By the end of WWII, Allied Troops were hunting down the remaining Japanese holdouts in South East Asia. British soldiers, led by Brigadier Richard Bethell, came to the city of Semarang to disarm Japanese troops and liberate POWs and their presence was initially welcomed by the Governor of Central Java Wongsonegoro. However, the locals were angered by the fact that Dutch POWs were being armed and triggered actions by the People's Security Army (TKR). The Allied Troops were overrun and escaped to nearby Ambarawa. On December 12, 1945, Col. Soedirman led an assault against the Allied troops and successfully cut-off their supply chain. The battle ended on December 15, 1945, with the Indonesian Army forcing Allied Troops to retreat back to Semarang.

Tourist attractions
Kampoeng Rawa
Indonesian Railway Museum
Fort Willem I

Notable people
 Simon Sanches, Dutch navy nurse and laboratory technician who planned to commit a coup d'état in Suriname.

References

External links 

http://dppad.jatengprov.go.id/up3ad-kab-semarang/ (source of population data)

Semarang Regency
Populated places in Central Java
Districts of Central Java